The Galaxy Y Pro DUOS GT-B5512 is a mobile phone from Samsung which was released in January 2012.  It features the ability to hold 2 SIM cards, plus has a full QWERTY keyboard and touchpad to navigate the Google Android operating system. It is the successor to the Galaxy Y Pro GT-5510.

See also
 Galaxy Nexus
 List of Android devices
 Samsung Galaxy Y
 Samsung Galaxy Y DUOS

References

External links 

Samsung mobile phones
Samsung smartphones
Android (operating system) devices
Mobile phones introduced in 2012